John Head (died 1391), of Gloucester, was an English politician.

He was a Member (MP) of the Parliament of England for Gloucester in April 1384 and February 1388.

References

Year of birth missing
1391 deaths
English MPs April 1384
English MPs February 1388
Members of the Parliament of England (pre-1707) for Gloucester